Carex atratiformis, also known as scrabrous black sedge, is a species of flowering plant in the sedge family, Cyperaceae. It is native to Canada and the Northeastern United States.

See also
 List of Carex species

References

atratiformis
Plants described in 1895
Flora of North America